Blues of Desperation is the twelfth studio album by American blues rock guitarist Joe Bonamassa. It was released on March 25, 2016 through J&R Records.

Reception
Blues of Desperation has been given a Metacritic score of 73 out of 100 based on 6 critics, indicating generally favorable reviews.

The album debuted at No. 12 on Billboard 200, No. 2 on Top Rock Albums, and No. 1 on the Blues Albums chart, selling 25,000 copies in the first week. The album has sold 68,000 copies in the United States as of August 2016.

Track listing

Charts

Weekly charts

Year-end charts

Certifications

References

2016 albums
Joe Bonamassa albums